Kirk G. Nielsen (born October 19, 1973) is an American former professional ice hockey player. He played 6 games in the NHL with the Boston Bruins during the 1997–98 season. The rest of his career, which lasted from 1996 to 1999, was spent in the minor leagues. He is the younger brother of Jeff Nielsen.

Selected tenth and last by the Philadelphia Flyers in the 1994 NHL Supplemental Draft, Nielsen was the final player chosen by this method, as the Supplemental Draft was discontinued after this season.

Career statistics

Regular season and playoffs

External links
 

1973 births
Living people
American men's ice hockey right wingers
Boston Bruins players
Cincinnati Cyclones (IHL) players
Harvard Crimson men's ice hockey players
Ice hockey players from Minnesota
National Hockey League supplemental draft picks
Philadelphia Flyers draft picks
Providence Bruins players
Sportspeople from Grand Rapids, Minnesota